Luo may refer to:

Luo peoples and languages
Luo peoples, an ethno-linguistic group of eastern and central Africa
Luo people of Kenya and Tanzania or Joluo, an ethnic group in western Kenya, eastern Uganda, and northern Tanzania.
Luoland, the tribal homeland of the group immediately above
Luo languages, a dozen languages spoken by the Luo peoples
Luo language (Kenya and Tanzania) or Dholuo
Southern Luo, a dialect cluster of Uganda and neighboring countries
Luo language (Cameroon), a nearly extinct language of Cameroon - not associated with Luo languages above

People
Luo (surname) (羅), Chinese surname
Luò (surname) (駱), Chinese surname
Jing Jing Luo, Chinese composer
Luo Changqing, killed in the 2019 Hong Kong protests
Michael Luo (born 1976), American journalist 
Show Lo (born 1979), Taiwanese singer, dancer and actor

Geography
Luo (state), a Chinese feudal state, 11th–7th centuries B.C.
Luo River (Henan) (洛河, Luohe), a tributary of the Yellow River, flows mostly in Henan province of China
Luo River (Shaanxi) (洛河, Luohe), river in Shaanxi, China, second largest tributary of the Wei River

Luo River (Fujian) (洛江, Luojiang), river in Fujian, China; flows into Quanzhou Bay of Taiwan Strait
Luo Scientific Reserve, a protected area in the Democratic Republic of the Congo
 Luo (also Luoyi 洛邑) the ancient Zhou capital: see Luoyang

Other uses
Luo (instrument), a type of Chinese gong
Luo, a character in the novel Balzac and the Little Chinese Seamstress by Dai Sijie

See also
LUO, the IATA abbreviation for Luena Airport in Angola
 Luo River (disambiguation)

Language and nationality disambiguation pages